Norbert Banaszek (born 18 June 1997) is a Polish cyclist, who currently rides for UCI Continental team . His brother Adrian Banaszek and cousin Alan Banaszek are also professional cyclists with the  team.

Major results
2015
 7th Overall La Coupe du Président de la Ville de Grudziądz
2016
 4th Memoriał Henryka Łasaka
2018
 7th Memoriał Henryka Łasaka
2019
 3rd Puchar Ministra Obrony Narodowej
 8th Overall Dookoła Mazowsza
2020
 1st  Overall In the footsteps of the Romans
1st Stage 1
 1st Stage 4 Tour of Bulgaria
2021 
 4th Overall Baltic Chain Tour
 5th Overall Tour of Szeklerland
2022
 1st  Road race, National Road Championships
 1st Stage 1 (TTT) Belgrade–Banja Luka

References

External links

1997 births
Living people
Polish male cyclists
Cyclists from Warsaw